Michael Fuimaono Ulufale (born February 1, 1972) is a former American football defensive tackle in the National Football League for the Dallas Cowboys.  He played college football at Brigham Young University and was drafted in the third round of the 1996 NFL Draft.

Early years
Ulufale attended James Campbell High School, where he lettered in football, baseball and basketball. As a senior, he was named a first-team West All-Star as a quarterback and linebacker. In basketball he was named second-team West All-Star.

Because of poor grades, he attended San Bernardino Valley College where he was a two-way player (defensive end and tight end). As a sophomore, he earned first-team All-American honors on defense and second-team on offense. He was also named the Foothill Conference Defensive MVP. He finished his 2 seasons with 131 tackles and 26 sacks.

Ulufale transferred to Brigham Young University but was medical redshirted in 1993, because of a shoulder injury. He became a starter at right defensive tackle as a junior and was third on the team in sacks (6) and tackles for loss (11). 

As a senior, he was suspended for 4 games in the middle of the season for breaking the school's honor code. He eventually played in six games, starting three at left defensive end, while registering 24 tackles (3 for loss).

Professional career

Dallas Cowboys
Ulufale was selected by the Dallas Cowboys in the third round of the 1996 NFL Draft. He suffered torn anterior cruciate ligament in his right knee during a practice, that placed him on the injured reserve list on November 21, 1996.

The next year, he suffered from a strained neck injury sustained during mini-camp practices. He was waived before the season started, so he filed a grievance for being released with an existing injury (strained neck).

San Jose SaberCats (AFL)
Ulufale signed with the San Jose SaberCats in 2000, and earned AFL All-Rookie honors when he registered four sacks, two interceptions, 11 passes batted down and six tackles in ten games. The next year, he finished with 3 sacks and 11 tackles in eight games, while being named second-team All-AFL. In 2002, he helped the team win the ArenaBowl XVI championship.

Los Angeles Avengers (AFL)
On October 30, 2002, he signed as a free agent with the Los Angeles Avengers and finished the season with 15 tackles, 11 passes batted down and tied for the team lead with 3 sacks.

Philadelphia Soul (AFL)
On February 24, 2004, the Philadelphia Soul traded Jeriod Johnson to the Los Angeles Avengers in exchange for Ulufale.

Personal life
In January 2004, his brothers Tali and Semeri died in a span of 24 hours of natural causes.

Ulufale is currently the football head coach for Saint Francis School.

References

External links
 BYU profile

1972 births
Living people
Players of American football from Honolulu
American sportspeople of Samoan descent
American football defensive tackles
BYU Cougars football players
Dallas Cowboys players
San Jose SaberCats players
Los Angeles Avengers players
High school football coaches in Hawaii
San Bernardino Valley College alumni